Ormen, also known as The Serpent, is a 1966 Swedish drama film directed by Hans Abramson. Christina Schollin won the award for Best Actress at the 3rd Guldbagge Awards.

Cast
 Harriet Andersson as Wera
 Morgan Andersson as Åke
 Eddie Axberg as Delivery boy
 Hans Bendrik as Sgt. Svensson
 Gudrun Brost as Maria Sandström
 Lars Edström as Pjatten
 Hans Ernback as Bill Stenberg
 Björn Gustafson as Mattsson
 Jens Christian Heusinger as Soldier
 Tor Isedal as Sgt. Bohman
 Pierre Lindstedt as Soldier
 Tommy Nilsson as Berndt Claesson
 Lars Passgård as Gideon
 Christina Schollin as Iréne Sandström
 Margareta Sjödin as Inga
 Signe Stade as Ing-Lis
 Lennart Sundberg as Train conductor
 Brita Öberg as Agda Morin

References

External links
 
 

1966 films
1966 drama films
Swedish drama films
1960s Swedish-language films
Swedish black-and-white films
1960s Swedish films